John Stewart Donald Tory (1903 – August 28, 1965) was a Canadian lawyer and founder of the law firm Torys, based in Toronto, Ontario.

Early life 
Tory was born in Toronto to John Alexander Tory Sr. (1869–1950) and Abigail Georgina Buckley (1875–1961). Tory's father was the youngest of three children and was a company director who became the head of the Ontario division of Sun Life Assurance Company.

Tory's great-grandfather, James Tory, was a soldier in the 71st Scottish Regiment. He was captured during the American Revolution and held as a prisoner of war. He later settled in Nova Scotia during the 1780s.

J.S.D. Tory attended Upper Canada College and the University of Toronto Schools. He graduated from Osgoode Hall Law School at the top of his class, and he earned a SJD degree from Harvard University.

Career 
Tory was called to the Ontario bar and later worked at the W. N. Tilley law firm in Toronto for a few years. In 1941, he launched his own firm (now known as Torys LLP) with a focus on corporate law.

He was also a director of A.V. Roe Canada. A literary award at the University of Toronto was named in his honour.

Personal life 
Tory married Kathreen Jean Arnold. They had three children – daughter Virginia, and fraternal twin sons John A. Tory and James Marshall Tory. Both sons later joined his law firm. His grandson is John Tory, former mayor of Toronto, Progressive Conservative Party of Ontario leader and member of his grandfather's firm. Tory and Arnold separated when their children were in their twenties.

References

External links 
 Torys LLP biography of John S. D. Tory

People from Old Toronto
John S.D.
Lawyers in Ontario
1903 births
1965 deaths
Osgoode Hall Law School alumni
Harvard Law School alumni
Upper Canada College alumni
Corporate lawyers
20th-century Canadian lawyers